3,3-Dimethyl-1-butanol (DMB) is a structural analog of choline.

Effects
DMB inhibits microbial trimethylamine (TMA) formation in mice and in human feces, thereby reducing plasma trimethylamine N-oxide (TMAO) levels after choline or carnitine supplementation. It consequently inhibited choline-enhanced endogenous macrophage foam cell formation and atherosclerotic lesion development in mice without alterations in circulating cholesterol levels.

While mice placed on a choline supplemented diet showed an increase in the proportions of the bacterial taxon Clostridiales in the gut, DMB induced a decrease in the proportions of this taxon.

Mice showed no evidence of toxicity to chronic (16-week) DMB exposure.

Occurrence
DMB is found in some balsamic vinegars, red wines, and some cold-pressed extra virgin olive oils and grapeseed oils.

References

Primary alcohols
Hexanols